Malaxis densiflora  is a species of orchid native to southern India. It generally has two leaves and purple flowers.

References

Orchids of India
Plants described in 1841
densiflora